Walter Dempster Jr. (May 20, 1924 – June 24, 2005), better known by his alias Walterina Markova, was a Filipino gay man who was forced as a "comfort gay" (sex slave) for Imperial Japanese Army soldiers during the Japanese occupation of the Philippines in World War II.

Biography
After Markova left home, he joined a group of six cross-dressing performers. It was as part of this group that he was arrested by Japanese soldiers, and taken to a camp which is now the Rizal Memorial Sports Complex. For several years he and his companions, and other "comfort gays", were put to forced labor and abused sexually by Japanese soldiers, as the "comfort women" were abused.

His story was made into a film called Markova: Comfort Gay in 2000, directed by Gil Portes. It was included in the 2002 Seattle Lesbian and Gay Film Festival and the San Francisco International Lesbian and Gay Film Festival.

Personal life

He spent the last years of his life at the Home for the Golden Gays in Pasay. He died at the age of 81 when he was accidentally hit by a cyclist.

He was quoted as saying: "As humans, we won’t live long. Revealing my own story is my way of inspiring other gays who continue to be oppressed today. By my act, I may have probably given freedom to many other gay people."

See also
Rosa Henson
Justo Justo
Home for the Golden Gays

References

External links

 

1924 births
2005 deaths
Pedestrian road incident deaths
Male-to-female cross-dressers
Filipino gay men
Filipino slaves
Filipino people of American descent
Violence against gay men
Violence against men in Asia
20th-century slaves
20th-century Filipino LGBT people